Heidi Hudson Leick (born May 9, 1969) is an American actress, known for her role as villainess Callisto in the television series Xena: Warrior Princess and Hercules: The Legendary Journeys. She is also a certified Yoga instructor and intuitive counselor.

Early life
Leick was born in Cincinnati, Ohio on May 9, 1969 and grew up in Rochester, New York.

Career

Acting 
Leick started her career as a model in Japan, but decided to concentrate on acting. She took courses in drama and diction to improve her voice. In 1992, she appeared in one episode of the series CBS Schoolbreak Special. The following year, Leick appeared in an episode of Law & Order. She played a small role as a "sexpot" in University Hospital as nurse Tracy Stone. In 1994, she appeared as the virtual reality designer Hannah in the television film Knight Rider 2010.

Leick's big break came in 1995 when she won a part on Melrose Place. Leick appeared in ten episodes of the series. After a couple of small roles in Hijacked: Flight 285 and Dangerous Cargo, the director Robert Tapert selected Leick for the role of Callisto on Xena: Warrior Princess. Leick also portrayed Callisto on three episodes of Xena companion TV series Hercules: The Legendary Journeys, as well as portraying screenwriter/producer Liz Friedman in two modern-day episodes.

In 2000, Leick announced at a convention that she would not be in more episodes of Xena: Warrior Princess or Hercules: The Legendary Journeys because she was being offered more and different roles, and felt that she needed to play another character besides Callisto. Beginning in 1999, she appeared in the films Chill Factor, Hallowed Ground, Blood Type, Denial, and After the Game, and had roles in the series 7th Heaven, Touched by an Angel, and Safe Harbor. She performed in A.I. Assault, CSI: Crime Scene Investigation, Lords of Everquest, Tru Calling (in its pilot episode), the voice of Jen in the computer game Primal, Fastlane and Cold Heart.

In 2008, she finished the films One, Two, Many and Unconditional. She played the role of Coco DeVille in the Jackie Collins film, Paris Connections, which was released in 2010, and was the final movie she shot.

Yoga & spiritual activities 
Leick has been practicing yoga since she was 23 years old. Coming from a very dark place in her teens and twenties, she believes yoga saved her.

Her teachers have been numerous but the ones she has studied with for longer periods of time are: Erich Schiffman, Bryan Kest, Gurmukh, Ana Forrest. This includes the practices of ashtanga yoga, hatha yoga, power yoga and kundalini yoga. She has taken Gabrielle Roth’s 5Rhythms movement classes for over 20 years and taught her version called Sacred Dance for over 15 years.

Leick is hosting her yoga workshops and retreats around the world, most often in the United States, Great Britain, Czech Republic and Slovakia. During the Covid-19 pandemic she hosted workshops and retreats online.

Leick also offers astrological readings and makes custom bracelets and necklaces.

Filmography

Film

Television

Video games

References

External links

Hudson Leick's Official Website

http://www.tv.com/people/hudson-leick/  

1969 births
Living people
Actresses from Cincinnati
American people of German descent
American film actresses
American television actresses
American video game actresses
American voice actresses
American yoga teachers
20th-century American actresses
21st-century American actresses
Female models from Ohio
Female models from New York (state)
Actresses from Rochester, New York
Educators from New York (state)
Educators from Ohio